António Leonel Vilar Nogueira Sousa (born 13 April 1980), known as Tonel, is a Portuguese former professional footballer who played as a central defender, and a manager.

Over ten seasons, he amassed Primeira Liga totals of 224 games and 15 goals, mainly representing Sporting with which he won four major titles. He also played three years in the Croatian First Football League, with Dinamo Zagreb.

Club career

Porto and Marítimo
Born in Lourosa (Santa Maria da Feira), Tonel came through the youth teams of FC Porto, and made his professional debut when he was loaned out to Académica de Coimbra during 2000–01, helping them to be promoted to the Primeira Liga in his second year. Despite earning a good reputation during his three-season spell, he was deemed surplus to requirements by his parent club and was released, moving to C.S. Marítimo during the 2004 off-season as part of an exchange deal with Porto which saw Pepe arrive at the Estádio do Dragão.

Tonel picked up some European experience during Marítimo's UEFA Cup tie against Rangers. He partnered with Dutchman Mitchell van der Gaag in defence and became one of the team's leading figures, playing 28 league games and scoring once in a 2–1 home win over Boavista F.C. on 25 September 2004.

Sporting CP
On 23 July 2005, after an impressive season, Tonel signed a three-year deal with Sporting CP for €500,000. His second stint with a club of the Big Three was much more successful than the first, as he was an everpresent figure at Sporting's back four since his arrival alongside Brazil international Ânderson Polga, also scoring the occasional goal on set pieces.

After furthering his link with the Lions until 2011, Tonel scored five goals overall during 2007–08, including one in a 2–1 win at FC Dynamo Kyiv in the group stage of the UEFA Champions League (incidentally, Polga netted the other). In late October 2008, after an injury in a draw at F.C. Paços de Ferreira, he lost his place to youth graduate Daniel Carriço, and never regained it again during the season, although he himself took Polga's place midway through the following campaign.

On 11 March 2010, Tonel was sent off at the end of a UEFA Europa League last 16 first leg game away to Atlético Madrid for striking Sergio Agüero. Fellow defender Leandro Grimi had been dismissed in the first half of the goalless draw, and Sporting lost the tie on the away goals rule.

Dinamo Zagreb
On 27 August 2010, after falling out of favour with new manager Paulo Sérgio, 30-year-old Tonel signed for Croatian club GNK Dinamo Zagreb. He made his official debut in an Eternal derby match drawn 1–1 away to HNK Hajduk Split, on 11 September; he was awarded the No. 13 shirt in the Prva HNL, but played with No. 28 in European fixtures, as Dario Šimić had been registered with the former number at the start of the 2010–11 season, before retiring in August 2010. His first season resulted in the team winning the league and cup double, and he scored in the 5–1 win (8–2 aggregate) over NK Varaždin in the cup final on 11 May.

In 2011–12, Tonel added a second consecutive double, after playing in a 3–1 cup final win over NK Osijek in May. He was released at the end of his contract, in December 2012.

Return to Portugal
On 7 January 2013, Tonel returned to his homeland and joined top division club S.C. Beira-Mar, signing until June 2014. After suffering relegation, however, he terminated his link and went on to spend a further two seasons in the second tier with C.D. Feirense.

Aged 35, Tonel returned to the top division on 9 June 2015 after agreeing to a one-year contract with C.F. Os Belenenses. Early into the campaign, he was criticised for committing a 90th-minute handball penalty in favour of his former team Sporting at the Estádio José Alvalade, with his action resulting in a 1–0 loss for Belenenses.

Management
After retiring, Tonel became sporting director of his hometown club Lusitânia FC. In March 2017, he replaced Martelinho as its manager in the Aveiro Football Association's first district league. He was himself relieved of his duties in June.

In January 2018, Tonel was appointed at C.F. União de Lamas in the same competition. He left six months later, having led them to fourth place.

International career
Tonel made his debut with Portugal in a UEFA Euro 2008 qualifier against Kazakhstan in Coimbra, playing 77 minutes in a 3–0 win on 15 November 2006. His second cap came more than three years later, on 3 March 2010, as he was called up as a last-minute replacement for injured Ricardo Carvalho for a friendly with China and played in a 2–0 win.

Career statistics

Honours

Club
Sporting CP
Taça de Portugal: 2006–07, 2007–08
Supertaça Cândido de Oliveira: 2007, 2008
Taça da Liga runner-up: 2007–08, 2008–09

Dinamo Zagreb
Croatian First Football League: 2010–11, 2011–12
Croatian Football Cup: 2010–11, 2011–12

International
Portugal Under-18
UEFA European Under-18 Championship: 1999

References

External links

1980 births
Living people
Sportspeople from Santa Maria da Feira
Portuguese footballers
Association football defenders
Primeira Liga players
Liga Portugal 2 players
Segunda Divisão players
FC Porto B players
Associação Académica de Coimbra – O.A.F. players
C.S. Marítimo players
Sporting CP footballers
S.C. Beira-Mar players
C.D. Feirense players
C.F. Os Belenenses players
Croatian Football League players
GNK Dinamo Zagreb players
Portugal youth international footballers
Portugal under-21 international footballers
Portugal international footballers
Portuguese expatriate footballers
Expatriate footballers in Croatia
Portuguese expatriate sportspeople in Croatia
Portuguese football managers